Sphegina rufiventris (Loew, 1863 ), the Black-horned Pufftail, is a common species of syrphid fly observed in the northestern United States. Hoverflies can remain nearly motionless in flight. The  adults are also known as flower flies for they are commonly found on flowers, from which they get both energy-giving nectar and protein-rich pollen. Larvae are found in accumulations of decaying sap under bark, usually in wet situations such as damp, shaded woodland and in partially submerged wood in streams and pools.

References

Eristalinae
Insects described in 1863
Diptera of North America
Taxa named by Hermann Loew